Svensen is an unincorporated community and census-designated place (CDP) on the Columbia River in Clatsop County, Oregon, United States, named after early settler Peter Svensen. There was a post office in Svensen from 1895 to 1944. Since the closure of the Svensen Post Office, mail service has been provided by rural carriers of the Astoria, Oregon post office. Svensen is within the Knappa School District.

Demographics

History

Svensen and Svensen Island are separated by Svensen Slough on the south side of the Columbia River at River Mile 24, between Settler's Point (downstream) and Knappa (upstream). The Lewis and Clark Expedition encamped in this area on November 26, 1805, en route to winter camp at Fort Clatsop. The Corps of Discovery again passed through the area on March 24, 1806 on their return journey.

Gallery

References

External links
Svensen and Svensen Island, Oregon at ColumbiaRiverImages.com
Oregon State Grange http://orgrange.org/find-a-grange/#Clatsop

Unincorporated communities in Clatsop County, Oregon
Unincorporated communities in Oregon
Census-designated places in Clatsop County, Oregon
Census-designated places in Oregon
1895 establishments in Oregon
Populated places established in 1895
Oregon populated places on the Columbia River